William Jackson Barry (1819 – 23 April 1907) was a New Zealand adventurer and writer. He was born in Melbourn, Cambridgeshire, England on 1819, and between 1866 and 1868 was Mayor of Cromwell.

In 1883, Barry bought a whale skeleton that had beached itself on the sands in Nelson. Barry prepared and exhibited the skeleton at a Nelson store, and then on tour, before arriving in Dunedin. The Otago Daily Times reported that Barry opened the whale up to public inspection in a warehouse in St Andrews Street, even going so far as to hold a dinner party in its jaws. By August 1883, Barry had sold the fin whale to Otago Museum, where it is still on display.

Barry wrote a fantastical autobiography in 1878, Up and Down: Or, Fifty Years' Colonial Experiences in Australia, California, New Zealand, India, China, and the South Pacific; Being the Life History of Capt. W. J. Barry. WRITTEN BY HIMSELF, 1878, with portrait of author, and other illustrations."

References

1819 births
1907 deaths
English emigrants to New Zealand
New Zealand writers
People from Melbourn